East of Eden is a 1955 American period drama film directed by Elia Kazan and written by Paul Osborn, loosely based on the fourth and final part of the 1952 novel of the same name by John Steinbeck. It stars James Dean as a wayward young man who, while seeking his own identity, vies for the affection of his deeply religious father against his favored brother, thus retelling the story of Cain and Abel. Appearing in supporting roles are Julie Harris, Raymond Massey, Burl Ives, Richard Davalos, and Jo Van Fleet.  

Although set in early 20th century Monterey, California, much of the film was actually shot on location in Mendocino, California.  Some scenes were filmed in the Salinas Valley. Of the three films in which James Dean played the lead, this is the only one to have been released during his lifetime.

East of Eden, along with Dean's other films Rebel Without a Cause (1955) and Giant (1956) was named one of the 400 best American films of all time by the American Film Institute. In 2016, the film was selected for preservation in the United States National Film Registry by the Library of Congress as being "culturally, historically, or aesthetically significant".

Plot
The plot line is loosely based on the biblical story of Cain and Abel. The story is set in 1917, during World War I, in the central California coastal towns of Monterey and Salinas. Cal and Aron are the young adult sons of a farmer and wartime draft board chairman, Adam Trask, with whom they live in the Salinas valley. Adam is a deeply religious Christian. Aron is pious, dutiful, and responsible, while Cal is moody, embittered, and thinks he is sinful. He believes his father loves only Aron. Adam told the boys their mother, Kate, died when they were infants. However, Cal discovers Kate operates a brothel in nearby Monterey, though he keeps this from Adam and Aron.

Adam's idealistic plans for a long-haul vegetable shipping enterprise end disastrously, losing him his entire savings. To recoup his father's loss, Cal decides to enter the bean-growing business, knowing that if the United States enters the war, bean prices will skyrocket. Cal hopes this will earn his father's love and respect. He goes to Kate to ask for the $5,000 capital he needs. Kate reveals she deserted the family because she hated living on the farm, never loved Adam, and rebelled against him completely controlling her. She shot Adam in the shoulder when he attempted to stop her leaving. Kate lends the money to Cal, noting the irony that the loan proceeds from her business are intended to preserve Adam's good name. Meanwhile, Aron's girlfriend, Abra, is growing attracted to Cal, who seems to reciprocate her feelings.

Cal's bean venture is successful, and he intends to give the profits to Adam at a surprise birthday party he and Abra have planned. As the party begins, Aron suddenly announces that he and Abra are engaged. While Adam is openly pleased, both Abra and Cal are uneasy due to their growing feelings for one another. Cal presents the money to his father; however, Adam refuses it, claiming it is war profiteering and demands he give it back to the farmers he "robbed." Adam adds that Aron's gift, compared to Cal's, is "honest and...good." A confused Cal sees his father's refusal as just another emotional rejection. When a distraught Cal leaves the room, Abra goes after him. Aron follows and orders Cal to stay away from her. Cal angrily tells Aron that their mother is alive, then takes him to her Monterey bordello. Cal roughly shoves the stunned Aron at the elderly Kate, causing her to fall. When Cal arrives home, Adam demands to know where Aron is. Cal initially responds he is not his brother's keeper, then tells Adam what he did.

The truth about his mother drives the pacifistic Aron to get drunk, lose control, and then board a troop train to enlist in the army. When the sheriff informs Adam, he rushes to the station in a futile attempt to dissuade him. Adam fails and watches helplessly as Aron smashes his head through the rail car window, maniacally laughing as the train pulls away. A shocked Adam suffers a stroke, leaving him paralyzed and unable to communicate. Cal tries talking to Adam, but gets no response and leaves the bedroom. Abra pleads with Adam to show Cal some affection before it is too late. When Cal makes his last bid for acceptance before leaving town, Adam manages to speak. He tells Cal to fire the annoying nurse, then whispers something to him. Cal tells Abra that Adam said he wants only Cal to care for him. The film ends with Cal, alone, sitting by his father's bedside, the emotional chasm between the father and son apparently healing.

Cast

Production

Director Elia Kazan first toyed with the idea of casting Marlon Brando as Cal and Montgomery Clift as Aron, but at 30 and 34 years old, respectively, they were simply too old to play teenage brothers. Paul Newman, who was one year younger than Brando, was a finalist for the part of Cal, which eventually was played by James Dean, who was six years younger than Newman.

Newman and Dean, who were up for the part of Cal, screen tested together for the parts of the rival brothers. In the end, Richard Davalos got the part of Aron. This was his screen debut.

Julie Harris was cast as Abra James. Executive producer Jack L. Warner was opposed to her casting, because she was ten years older than her character.

Kazan denied rumors that he didn't like Dean: "You can't not like a guy with that much pain in him…  You know how a dog will be mean and snarl at you, then you pat him, and he's all over you with affection? That's the way Dean was." Kazan did intervene sternly, however, when Dean started to feel his power as a hotly emerging star and treated crew members disrespectfully.

Locations include:  Mendocino County, California; Salinas, California; and Salinas Valley, California.

Themes and character motivations
The underlying theme of East of Eden is a biblical reference to the brothers Cain and Abel. Cal is constantly struggling to earn his father's approval. The relationship between Cal and his father is a stressful one and is not resolved until late in the story, after his father suffers a paralyzing stroke. In his paralyzed state and with the help of Julie Harris' character, Abra, Cal's father finally expresses his suppressed love for the boy.

Other themes touched upon in the film include anti-German xenophobia, specifically as wrought against a local German immigrant as resentment about United States entry into World War I grew. The themes of young love and sibling rivalry are also present in the film, as Aron's girlfriend finds herself increasingly drawn to the more rebellious Cal.

Critical reaction
Dave Kehr of the Chicago Reader praised the adaptation by Kazan and the "down-to-earth" performances of James Dean and Richard Davalos. Bosley Crowther, writing for The New York Times, described the film as having "energy and intensity but little clarity and emotion"; he notes:

According to Truman Capote, "many critics reviewing [the film] remarked on the well-nigh plagiaristic resemblance between [Dean's] acting mannerisms and [Marlon] Brando's." Bosley Crowther called Dean's performance a "mass of histrionic gingerbread" which clearly emulated the style of Brando. Kate Cameron, of the New York Daily News, on the other hand, proclaimed Dean "a new star" who had "walked away with most of the honors." While conceding that he did "sound at times like Marlon Brando," she called him "a fine actor" who "plays his first film role with a naturalness that is completely convincing."

Fifty years later, film critic Kenneth Turan of the Los Angeles Times was much more positive, saying East of Eden is "not only one of Kazan's richest films and Dean's first significant role, it is also arguably the actor's best performance."  The film's depiction of the interaction between Dean and Massey was characterized by Turan as "the paradigmatic generational conflict in all of American film."

Actor Leonardo DiCaprio stated in an interview with MTV that East of Eden was the film that made him "obsessed with movies".

Awards and honors

See also
 List of American films of 1955

References

Further reading
 Tibbetts, John C., and James M. Welsh, eds. The Encyclopedia of Novels Into Film (2nd ed. 2005) pp 111–112.

External links

 
 
 
 
 
 East of Eden resource guide by Automation Librarian Terry Ballard
  Fandango Media MOVIECLIPS Trailer
 'East of Eden' | A. O. Scott | Critics' Picks | The New York Times - YouTube

1955 films
1955 drama films
American drama films
Best Drama Picture Golden Globe winners
Cultural depictions of Cain and Abel
Films scored by Leonard Rosenman
Films about brothers
Films about dysfunctional families
Films based on works by John Steinbeck
Films based on the Book of Genesis
Films directed by Elia Kazan
Films about Christianity
Films featuring a Best Supporting Actress Academy Award-winning performance
Films set in 1917
Films set in 1918
Films set in the San Francisco Bay Area
Films set in California
Films shot in California
Warner Bros. films
United States National Film Registry films
James Dean
CinemaScope films
1950s English-language films
1950s American films